Pedro Gerardo Torruellas Brito (born 2 November 1964), better known as Playero DJ, DJ Playero, Playe, Play, was a key figure in the dissemination of reggaeton during its formative period in the 1990s in San Juan, Puerto Rico.

Early life 
Beginning in the early 1990s, he intended to do what DJ Tony Touch was already doing in New York, who was releasing a series of mixtapes, mixing popular and classic songs off most known musical styles like Reggae, Hip Hop and House. It is rumored that Playero gained his name for always using colorful t-shirts that resembled the spirit of the Summer season, and people wore them when going to the beach and they were called "Summer T'shirts", which translated in Spanish would be "Camisas Playeras".

Mixtapes 
Though Playero's mixtapes presumably started in Number 1 and synthesized hip-hop and dancehall/reggae rhythms, it is not known that Volumes 1 to 33 do already exist. Playero #34 made its appearance on the Internet some years ago and it was heard by people around the world realizing that this mixtape was putting together dancehall, hip hop and Puerto Rican singers freestyling in Spanish-language.

These tape and the following 35 and 36 circulated around the barrios of San Juan and were highly influential upon the generation that would go on to define reggaeton in the coming decade. Most of these tapes were sold by Playero himself and the singers who had recorded in them. That's how Daddy Yankee got his start with DJ Playero, debuting on the mixtape Playero 34, which was recorded in a small studio in one of Puerto Rico's caseríos and was originally released in 1992. It contained several jamaican dancehall songs which were mixed and edited like "Freaks" (Lil Vicious).

Career 
DJ Playero was an aspiring producer at the time, he worked in the first LP of The Pioneer Lisa M (Trampa 1990) and (No Lo Derrumbes 1990) 3-2 Get Funky (3-2 Get Funky, 1993; Return of the Funky Ones, 1994), Ranking Stone (Different Styles, 1995), Wiso G (Estoy Aqui, 1996), and Wendellman (Wendellman, 1996). During the late 1990s, as the proto-reggaeton style began to grow popular thanks to 'The Noise', a club-based collective that issued a long-running series of CDs. Playero en DVD: Su Trayectoria (2003) was the culmination of this activity, aiming to cement his legacy as one of the key reggaeton pioneers.

Discography

Mixtapes
 Playero 1 - 33  
 Playero 34 (1992)
 Playero 35 (1992)
 Playero 36 (1992)

Studio albums
 Playero 37
Underground (1992)
The Original (2CD) (87 min. version) (Edited) (1999)
20th. Anniversary Edition (Digital Reissue) (2012)
 Playero 38 (1993) 
Special Edition (2CD Reissue) (2000)
 Playero 39: Respect (1995)
 DJ Playero Presenta: Montana Collection Vol. 1 (1995)
 Playero 40: New Era (1996)
 Playero 41: Past Present & Future
 Part 1 (1998)
 Part 2 (1999)
 DJ Playero Presenta Berto Guayama - Deja Vú (2001)
 Playero 42: El Especialista, Episodio 1 (2002)
 Playero 43 (TBA)

Compilations
 Playero DJ Presenta: Éxitos 95 (1995)
 Playero DJ – Greatest Hits – Street Mix (1995)
 M.C. Stop Reggae (1995)
 Playero DJ – Greatest Hits – Street Mix Vol. 2 (1997)
 Playero Presenta: Éxitos 97 (1998)
 Playero DJ – Greatest Hits – Street Mix Vol. 3 (1999)
 DJ Playero: The Collection (2CD) (2002)
 Playero DJ - The Best Of (2002)
 Playero DJ - Old School Reggaeton (2009)

Instrumental albums
 Playero Pistas - Play The Beat (2000)

Live albums
 Playero DJ Live (1996)
 Playero - Naranjito Live (1997)

Bootlegs
 Playero DJ - Live from New York Discoteque (Show) (1993)
 Playero Rap & Reggae 96 (for the Radial Show "Rap & Reggae 96" on Y96) (1995)
 Playero - Birthday Live In Cupey  (1996)

CD singles
 DJ Playero - Radio Version (1997)

Other albums to which he has collaborated 
 M.C. Non Stop Reggae Vol. 1 (1994)
 M.C. Non Stop Reggae Vol. 2 (1995)
 Reggae 4 U (1995) (with DJ Black) 
 Wendellman (with Wendellman and DJ Karlo) (1996)
 Boricua Guerrero - The E.P. (with Nico Canada) (1997)
 The Legend (1997)
 Los Más Buscados (with Nico Canada, DJ Joe and DJ Blass) (2002)
 The Majestic 1 (2002)
 Kilates 1: Rompiendo el Silencio (2002)
 The Majestic 2: Segundo Imperio (2004)
 Kilates 2: Segundo Impacto - El Silencio Que Duele (2004)

Filmography
 Playero En DVD – Su Trayectoria (DVDA) (2003)

References

External links
 Facebook

1964 births
Living people
Reggaeton record producers
Musicians from San Juan, Puerto Rico
Puerto Rican reggaeton musicians